The Beekeeper of Aleppo is a 2019 novel by Christy Lefteri. It deals with the plight of refugees from Aleppo in Syria to Europe during the Syrian Civil War. While a work of fiction, it is based on the author's experience over two summers volunteering in Athens at a refugee center.

Adaptions 
In 2023, Nesrin Alrefaai and Matthew Spangler adapted the story for stage. UK Productions staged the production at various locations in the United Kingdom, including Nottingham Playhouse.

Reception 
Reviewing the play for The Guardian, Anya Ryan said the story was powerful, but that '... there is a stiffness and sense of detachment to the staging.'

References

2019 British novels
Works about the Syrian civil war
Refugees and displaced people in fiction
Works about the European migrant crisis
Fiction about beekeeping
Novels set in Syria
Novels set in Turkey
Novels set in Greece
Novels set in England